Dewsbury is a town and an unparished area in the metropolitan borough of Kirklees, West Yorkshire, England.  It contains 128 listed buildings that are recorded in the National Heritage List for England.  Of these, two are listed at Grade I, the highest of the three grades, two are at Grade II*, the middle grade, and the others are at Grade II, the lowest grade.  The list consists of the listed buildings in the town and the countryside to the south, and includes the districts, villages and smaller settlements of Boothroyd, Briestfield, Hanging Heaton, Overthorpe, Ravensthorpe, Thornhill, and Whitley Lower.

Dewsbury was a market town until the arrival of the Industrial Revolution, which brought the woollen industry to the area.  This was made possible by the communications provided by the River Calder and the Calder and Hebble Navigation which pass to the south of the town, and the railway, which passes through it.  The listed buildings associated with water transport include locks, bridges, and a milestone, and those associated with the railway are a railway station, a viaduct, a bridges, and a series of underbridges. Crow Nest Park was developed in the grounds of Crow Nest House, which is listed together with structures in its grounds, and its three main entrances.  The other listed buildings include houses and associated structures, cottages, farmhouses and farm buildings, churches and items in churchyards, schools, the base of a market cross and a memorial stone, shops, offices and warehouses, a road bridge, a textile mill and a former mill, a boundary stone, public houses and a hotel, a set of toll gates, banks, civic buildings, a former hospital, cemetery buildings, two war memorials, and telephone kiosks.


Key

Buildings

References

Notes

Citations

Sources

Lists of listed buildings in West Yorkshire
Listed